Here's to You Charlie Brown: 50 Great Years! is an album by American pianist David Benoit released in 2000, and recorded for the GRP label. The album reached No. 2 on Billboards Jazz chart. The album is a memorial to Charles M. Schulz, creator of Peanuts, and jazz pianist Vince Guaraldi, who composed music scores for the first 16 television specials before his untimely death in 1976.

Track listing

 Personnel David Benoit Trio David Benoit – acoustic piano, arrangements, orchestra arrangements and conductor (10)
 Christian McBride – bass
 Peter Erskine – drums, percussionGuest Musicians Vince Guaraldi – acoustic piano (1)
 Marc Antoine – guitar (3, 9)
 Russell Malone – guitar (8)
 Chris Botti – trumpet (4)
 Michael Brecker – tenor saxophone (5)
 Bruce Dukov – concertmaster (10)
 Ken Gruberman – music contractor (10)
 Take 6 – vocals (6)
 Al Jarreau – vocals (10)

 Production 
 Tommy LiPuma – producer
 Clark Germain – engineer 
 Marcelo Pennell – engineer
 Bill Schnee – engineer, mixing 
 Koji Egawa – assistant engineer
 Doug Sax – mastering 
 Ken Gruberman – music preparation
 John Newcott – production coordinator 
 Robert Silverman – production coordinator 
 Yvonne Wish – production coordinator 
 Camille Tominaro – production manager
 J. Arthur Thomas – business manager
 Charles M. Schultz – illustration
 Hollis King – art direction 
 Watts Design? – design 
 Vincent Titolo – photography 
 David Benoit – liner notes 
 Lee Mendelson – liner notes
 Larry Fitzgerald – management 
 Mark Hartley – managementStudios'
 Recorded at Capitol Studios (Hollywood, CA); Bill Schnee Studios (North Hollywood, CA); Avatar Studios (New York, NY); Sound Kitchen (Franklin, TN).
 Mixed at Bill Schnee Studios.
 Mastered at The Mastering Lab (Hollywood, CA).

Charts

References

External links
David Benoit-Here's To You Charlie Brown: 50 Great Years! at Discogs

2000 albums
David Benoit (musician) albums
Vince Guaraldi tribute albums
albums produced by Tommy LiPuma
GRP Records albums
Peanuts music